Działdowo railway station is a railway station serving the town of Działdowo, in the Warmian-Masurian Voivodeship, Poland. The station is located on the Warsaw–Gdańsk railway, Działdowo–Chojnice railway and Działdowo–Olsztyn railway. The train services are operated by PKP, Polregio and Koleje Mazowieckie.

Modernisation
From 2010 until 2014 the station building and platforms were rebuilt. Also, as part of the modernisation the Local Control Centre in Dzialdowo, which includes a section of railway line No. 9 from Montowa to the border of the province. In November 2011, the station was opened to travellers, and adapted to the needs of people with disabilities.

Train services
The station is served by the following service(s):

Intercity services Gdynia - Gdansk - Malbork - Warsaw - Katowice - Krakow
 Intercity services (IC) Łódź Fabryczna — Warszawa — Gdańsk Glowny — Kołobrzeg
Intercity services (IC) Olsztyn - Warszawa - Skierniewice - Łódź
Intercity services (IC) Olsztyn - Warszawa - Skierniewice - Częstochowa - Katowice - Bielsko-Biała
Intercity services (IC) Olsztyn - Warszawa - Skierniewice - Częstochowa - Katowice - Gliwice - Racibórz
Intercity services (TLK) Gdynia Główna — Zakopane 
Intercity services (TLK) Kołobrzeg — Gdynia Główna — Warszawa Wschodnia — Kraków Główny
Regional services (KM R90/RE90) Dzialdowo - Mlawa - Nasielsk - Modlin - Legionowo - Warsaw
Regional services (R) Iława Główna — Działdowo

References

 This article is based upon a translation of the Polish language version as of October 2016.

External links

Railway stations in Warmian-Masurian Voivodeship
Działdowo County